The Western Women's Canadian Football League (WWCFL) is a full-contact women's Canadian football league which began play in the spring of 2011. The league plays an annual season in the spring or summer, and with eight teams it is the largest women's football league in Canada. The teams play 12-woman tackle football games using the Football Canada rules, somewhat similar to those of the Canadian Football League. The league has teams in Manitoba, Saskatchewan and Alberta (the Prairie Provinces).

League history
Katrina Krawec wrote, "The WWCFL is a non-profit sport organization that provides women with opportunities to play football", and "The distribution of power in the WWCFL is decentralized and democratic", with each team having one representative on the league board alongside elected members.

The first season of play, 2011, ended with a championship game which was played in the city of Lethbridge, Alberta. The game was played between the Edmonton Storm and the Saskatoon Valkyries. The Valkyries became the first WWCFL Champions, with a final score of 35–7.

The WWCFL's second year (2012) saw the same seven teams compete. The championship game was held in Saskatoon, Saskatchewan, with the Saskatoon Valkyries defending their title by defeating the Lethbridge Steel 64–21.

Two new teams joined the league in 2013. The Northern Anarchy was based in Grande Prairie, Alberta. and the Okotoks Lady Outlawz in Okotoks, Alberta. Talks involved the league going as high as 11 teams for 2013, including expansion into British Columbia, but it never occurred. In 2014, the Okotoks Lady Outlawz did not field a team for WWCFL play, and suspended operations. The Northern Anarchy took a break in 2015, although practice sessions continued, and the Anarchy returned to the field in the 2016 season.

On March 29, 2020, the league cancelled its season because of the COVID-19 pandemic. The 2021 season was also cancelled, for the same reason. The WWCFL returned to action in the 2022 season, for the first time since 2019.

Teams

Western Conference

Prairie Conference

Suspended operations

WWCFL Championship results

See also
 List of gridiron football teams in Canada
 List of leagues of American football

External links
 "Shaping and Being Shaped: Examining Women's Tackle Football in Canada", by Katrina Krawec – University of Windsor, 2014

References

2011 establishments in Canada
Canadian football
Canadian football leagues
Professional sports leagues in Canada
Sport in Western Canada
Sports leagues established in 2011
Women's American football leagues
Women's sports in Canada